Exvangelical is a social movement of people who have left evangelicalism, especially white evangelical churches in the United States, for atheism, agnosticism, progressive Christianity, or any other religious belief, or lack thereof. The hashtag #exvangelical was coined by Blake Chastain in 2016 to make "a safe space for people to find solidarity with others who have gone through similar experiences."

People in the movement are called "exvangelicals" or "exvies." Many attribute their departure to experiences of homophobia, misogyny, and racism in evangelicalism, or to a personal crisis of faith such as sexual abuse in a religious setting and/or by a religious leader or volunteer (often which was ignored, actively covered up, and in some cases the victim was subject to DARVO treatment).

The movement is disseminated largely via podcasts. Popular exvangelical podcasts include Almost Heretical, Straight White American Jesus, and Chastain's podcast Exvangelical.

Motivations

Many exvangelicals are young people who choose to leave their religion following disagreements over issues such as science, the role and treatment of women, LGBT rights, sexual abuse cover-ups, and Christian nationalism. Specific incidents cited by exvangelicals for leaving include the Nashville Statement and evangelical support for Trump, which they perceived as hypocritical.

Rejection of purity culture is the subject of exvangelical author Linda Kay Klein. Joshua Harris wrote I Kissed Dating Goodbye in 1997, a book foundational to purity culture, which encouraged young people to avoid dating and instead practice courtship and abstinence. Harris repudiated his work in 2018, apologizing for its content and withdrawing it from publication. The following year, Harris announced that he was no longer a Christian, describing his experience as a "deconstruction" of his faith and apologizing for his previous teachings against LGBTQ+ people.

Related movements

Deconstructing faith is a process or movement in which a person challenges their personal beliefs and traditions. It results in some people leaving the Christian faith, while others remain in it but in a different setting (such as leaving a conservative Evangelical church which opposes homosexuality for an LGBTQ+ affirming one), and still others may return to the faith they originally held.

The #churchtoo movement seeks to draw attention to sexual abuse in churches. Vocal critics of sexual abuse are Emily Joy and Hannah Paasch.

The #emptythepews movement urges opposition to evangelicalism in the United States due to its support for former president Donald Trump. It was started by exvangelical Chrissy Stroop.

Reception 
In Christianity Today's podcast The Rise and Fall of Mars Hill, Baylor University professor Matthew Lee Anderson said the experiences of exvangelicals were "something very different than deep, difficult, self-examination in order to find the truth" and any bad experiences that drove people to leave were "sociologically, actually quite marginal experiences inside of white evangelicalism."  

When a Gallup poll showed that less than half of Americans belonged to any church in March 2021, some commentators acknowledged criticisms raised by the exvangelical perspective. Russell Moore, director of the Public Theology Project at Christianity Today, speculated that if he were a teenager today, he may also have left the church.  He found that "they have come to think the church doesn’t believe its own moral teachings" and so "the presenting issue in this secularization is not scientism and hedonism but disillusionment and cynicism."

Outside the United States

Although it started in the United States, the exvangelical movement has also been noted in Brazil during the presidency of Jair Bolsonaro.

See also

Organizations supporting people leaving controlling religions
 
 
 
 Dare To Doubt - American organization helping people detach from belief systems they come to find harmful by Alice Greczyn.

References

Further reading

 
 
 

Former evangelicals
Evangelicalism in the United States
Christian terminology